Fauji means soldier in Urdu, Sindhi and Hindi languages, and may refer to:

Entertainment 
 Fauji (TV series), 1989 TV series
 Fauji (1995 film), Indian movie

Companies
 Fauji Foundation, Pakistan
 Fauji Fertilizer Company Limited, Pakistan
 Fauji Fertilizer Bin Qasim, Pakistan
 Fauji Meat, Pakistan
 Fauji Foods, Pakistan
 Fauji Power, Pakistan

Hospitals
 Fauji Foundation Hospital, Lahore, Pakistan

Colleges
 Fauji Foundation College, Rawalpindi, Pakistan